Wendy Koenig (born May 28, 1955) is an American middle-distance runner. She competed in the 800 metres at the 1972 Summer Olympics and the 1976 Summer Olympics.

References

External links
 

1955 births
Living people
Athletes (track and field) at the 1972 Summer Olympics
Athletes (track and field) at the 1976 Summer Olympics
American female middle-distance runners
Olympic track and field athletes of the United States
Place of birth missing (living people)
21st-century American women